TPWS may refer to:
 Tasmania Parks and Wildlife Service
 Train Protection & Warning System
 Terrain Proximity Warning System, see Ground proximity warning system